Sheikh Salem Sabah Al-Salem Al-Sabah (18 June 1938 – 8 October 2007) was a senior member of the House of Al-Sabah of Kuwait.

Biography
Salem Al Sabah was the eldest son of the 12th Ruler and 2nd Emir of Kuwait, Sheikh Sabah Al-Salem Al-Sabah. He served as the Ambassador of Kuwait in the United Kingdom, the United States, Canada and several other European countries from the early 1960s to the mid-1970s. He then served as Kuwait's deputy prime minister and held various cabinet posts, including defence minister, foreign minister, interior minister and social affairs minister. He was also the chairman of the Kuwait's POW and Kidnapped Committee, which even when he was seriously sick, his deputies at the committee would visit his home at Messila Palace to give him the latest news regarding the POWs in Iraq.

Salem died at age 69 on 8 October 2007. He was survived by his wife, Badriya, and his four children. His eldest son, Basel, was killed by his uncle in June 2010.

References

1938 births
2007 deaths
House of Al-Sabah
Ambassadors of Kuwait to the United States
Ambassadors of Kuwait to the United Kingdom
Ambassadors of Kuwait to Canada
Kuwaiti diplomats
Foreign ministers of Kuwait
Government ministers of Kuwait
Defence ministers of Kuwait
Sons of monarchs